Sinocyclocheilus macroscalus is a species of ray-finned fish in the genus Sinocyclocheilus.

References 

macroscalus
Fish described in 2000